Reinhold Schmidt (17 August 1902 – 16 August 1974) was a German sprinter. He competed in the men's 400 metres at the 1928 Summer Olympics. Schmidt was also a two-time German national champion in the 1920s, and also was part of the relay team that set a new world record in 1927.

References

External links
 

1902 births
1974 deaths
Athletes (track and field) at the 1928 Summer Olympics
German male sprinters
Olympic athletes of Germany
Place of birth missing